Davit Mchedlishvili (born 5 April 1988 in Tbilisi) is a Georgian footballer who plays for Ameri Tbilisi at Pirveli Liga.

Mchedlishvili made his debut for Georgia on 27 February 2006, against Moldova U21 in Malta Tournament. He also played the game against Malta on 2 March.

External links

Footballers from Georgia (country)
Georgia (country) international footballers
Association football midfielders
Footballers from Tbilisi
1988 births
Living people